The cell is the basic structural and functional unit of life forms. Every cell consists of a cytoplasm enclosed within a membrane, and contains many biomolecules such as proteins, DNA and RNA, as well as many small molecules of nutrients and metabolites.  The term comes from the Latin word  meaning 'small room'.

Cells can acquire specified function and carry out various tasks within the cell such as replication, DNA repair, protein synthesis, and motility. Cells are capable of specialization and mobility within the cell. Most cells are measured in micrometers due to their small size.

Most plant and animal cells are only visible under a light microscope, with dimensions between 1 and 100 micrometres. Electron microscopy gives a much higher resolution showing greatly detailed cell structure. Organisms can be classified as unicellular (consisting of a single cell such as bacteria) or multicellular (including plants and animals). Most unicellular organisms are classed as microorganisms. The number of cells in plants and animals varies from species to species; it has been approximated that the human body contains an estimated 37 trillion (3.72×1013) cells. The brain accounts for around 80 billion of these cells.

The study of cells and how they work has led to many other studies in related areas of biology, including: discovery of DNA, cancer systems biology, aging and developmental biology.

Cell biology is the study of cells, which were discovered by Robert Hooke in 1665, who named them for their resemblance to cells inhabited by Christian monks in a monastery. Cell theory, first developed in 1839 by Matthias Jakob Schleiden and Theodor Schwann, states that all organisms are composed of one or more cells, that cells are the fundamental unit of structure and function in all living organisms, and that all cells come from pre-existing cells. Cells emerged on Earth about 4 billion years ago.

Cell types
Cells are of two types: eukaryotic, which contain a nucleus, and prokaryotic cells, which do not have a nucleus, but a nucleoid region is still present. Prokaryotes are single-celled organisms, while eukaryotes may be either single-celled or multicellular.

Prokaryotic cells

Prokaryotes include bacteria and archaea, two of the three domains of life. Prokaryotic cells were the first form of life on Earth, characterized by having vital biological processes including cell signaling. They are simpler and smaller than eukaryotic cells, and lack a nucleus, and other membrane-bound organelles. The DNA of a prokaryotic cell consists of a single circular chromosome that is in direct contact with the cytoplasm. The nuclear region in the cytoplasm is called the nucleoid. Most prokaryotes are the smallest of all organisms ranging from 0.5 to 2.0 μm in diameter.

A prokaryotic cell has three regions:
 Enclosing the cell is the cell envelope – generally consisting of a plasma membrane covered by a cell wall which, for some bacteria, may be further covered by a third layer called a capsule. Though most prokaryotes have both a cell membrane and a cell wall, there are exceptions such as Mycoplasma (bacteria) and Thermoplasma (archaea) which only possess the cell membrane layer. The envelope gives rigidity to the cell and separates the interior of the cell from its environment, serving as a protective filter. The cell wall consists of peptidoglycan in bacteria and acts as an additional barrier against exterior forces. It also prevents the cell from expanding and bursting (cytolysis) from osmotic pressure due to a hypotonic environment. Some eukaryotic cells (plant cells and fungal cells) also have a cell wall.
 Inside the cell is the cytoplasmic region that contains the genome (DNA), ribosomes and various sorts of inclusions. The genetic material is freely found in the cytoplasm. Prokaryotes can carry extrachromosomal DNA elements called plasmids, which are usually circular. Linear bacterial plasmids have been identified in several species of spirochete bacteria, including members of the genus Borrelia notably Borrelia burgdorferi, which causes Lyme disease. Though not forming a nucleus, the DNA is condensed in a nucleoid. Plasmids encode additional genes, such as antibiotic resistance genes.
 On the outside, flagella and pili project from the cell's surface. These are structures (not present in all prokaryotes) made of proteins that facilitate movement and communication between cells.

Eukaryotic cells

Plants, animals, fungi, slime moulds, protozoa, and algae are all eukaryotic. These cells are about fifteen times wider than a typical prokaryote and can be as much as a thousand times greater in volume. The main distinguishing feature of eukaryotes as compared to prokaryotes is compartmentalization: the presence of membrane-bound organelles (compartments) in which specific activities take place. Most important among these is a cell nucleus, an organelle that houses the cell's DNA. This nucleus gives the eukaryote its name, which means "true kernel (nucleus)". Some of the other differences are:
 The plasma membrane resembles that of prokaryotes in function, with minor differences in the setup. Cell walls may or may not be present.
 The eukaryotic DNA is organized in one or more linear molecules, called chromosomes, which are associated with histone proteins. All chromosomal DNA is stored in the cell nucleus, separated from the cytoplasm by a membrane. Some eukaryotic organelles such as mitochondria also contain some DNA.
 Many eukaryotic cells are ciliated with primary cilia. Primary cilia play important roles in chemosensation, mechanosensation, and thermosensation. Each cilium may thus be "viewed as a sensory cellular antennae that coordinates a large number of cellular signaling pathways, sometimes coupling the signaling to ciliary motility or alternatively to cell division and differentiation."
 Motile eukaryotes can move using motile cilia or flagella. Motile cells are absent in conifers and flowering plants. Eukaryotic flagella are more complex than those of prokaryotes.

Cell shapes 
Cell shape, also called cell morphology, has been hypothesized to form from the arrangement and movement of the cytoskeleton. Many advancements in the study of cell morphology come from studying simple bacteria such as Staphylococcus aureus,  E. coli,  and B. subtilis. Different cell shapes have been found and described, but how and why cells form different shapes is still widely unknown. Some cell shapes that have been identified include rods, cocci and spirochaetes. Cocci have a circular shape, bacilli have an elongated rod-like shape, and spirochaetes have a spiral shape. Many other shapes have also been determined.

Subcellular components
All cells, whether prokaryotic or eukaryotic, have a membrane that envelops the cell, regulates what moves in and out (selectively permeable), and maintains the electric potential of the cell. Inside the membrane, the cytoplasm takes up most of the cell's volume. Except red blood cells, which lack a cell nucleus and most organelles to accommodate maximum space for hemoglobin, all cells possess DNA, the hereditary material of genes, and RNA, containing the information necessary to build various proteins such as enzymes, the cell's primary machinery. There are also other kinds of biomolecules in cells. This article lists these primary cellular components, then briefly describes their function.

Cell membrane

The cell membrane, or plasma membrane, is a selectively permeable biological membrane that surrounds the cytoplasm of a cell. In animals, the plasma membrane is the outer boundary of the cell, while in plants and prokaryotes it is usually covered by a cell wall. This membrane serves to separate and protect a cell from its surrounding environment and is made mostly from a double layer of phospholipids, which are amphiphilic (partly hydrophobic and partly hydrophilic). Hence, the layer is called a phospholipid bilayer, or sometimes a fluid mosaic membrane. Embedded within this membrane is a macromolecular structure called the porosome the universal secretory portal in cells and a variety of protein molecules that act as channels and pumps that move different molecules into and out of the cell. The membrane is semi-permeable, and selectively permeable, in that it can either let a substance (molecule or ion) pass through freely, pass through to a limited extent or not pass through at all. Cell surface membranes also contain receptor proteins that allow cells to detect external signaling molecules such as hormones.

Cytoskeleton

The cytoskeleton acts to organize and maintain the cell's shape; anchors organelles in place; helps during endocytosis, the uptake of external materials by a cell, and cytokinesis, the separation of daughter cells after cell division; and moves parts of the cell in processes of growth and mobility. The eukaryotic cytoskeleton is composed of microtubules, intermediate filaments and microfilaments. In the cytoskeleton of a neuron the intermediate filaments are known as neurofilaments. There are a great number of proteins associated with them, each controlling a cell's structure by directing, bundling, and aligning filaments. The prokaryotic cytoskeleton is less well-studied but is involved in the maintenance of cell shape, polarity and cytokinesis. The subunit protein of microfilaments is a small, monomeric protein called actin. The subunit of microtubules is a dimeric molecule called tubulin. Intermediate filaments are heteropolymers whose subunits vary among the cell types in different tissues. Some of the subunit proteins of intermediate filaments include vimentin, desmin, lamin (lamins A, B and C), keratin (multiple acidic and basic keratins), and neurofilament proteins (NF–L, NF–M).

Genetic material

Two different kinds of genetic material exist: deoxyribonucleic acid (DNA) and ribonucleic acid (RNA). Cells use DNA for their long-term information storage. The biological information contained in an organism is encoded in its DNA sequence. RNA is used for information transport (e.g., mRNA) and enzymatic functions (e.g., ribosomal RNA). Transfer RNA (tRNA) molecules are used to add amino acids during protein translation.

Prokaryotic genetic material is organized in a simple circular bacterial chromosome in the nucleoid region of the cytoplasm. Eukaryotic genetic material is divided into different, linear molecules called chromosomes inside a discrete nucleus, usually with additional genetic material in some organelles like mitochondria and chloroplasts (see endosymbiotic theory).

A human cell has genetic material contained in the cell nucleus (the nuclear genome) and in the mitochondria (the mitochondrial genome). In humans, the nuclear genome is divided into 46 linear DNA molecules called chromosomes, including 22 homologous chromosome pairs and a pair of sex chromosomes. The mitochondrial genome is a circular DNA molecule distinct from nuclear DNA. Although the mitochondrial DNA is very small compared to nuclear chromosomes, it codes for 13 proteins involved in mitochondrial energy production and specific tRNAs.

Foreign genetic material (most commonly DNA) can also be artificially introduced into the cell by a process called transfection. This can be transient, if the DNA is not inserted into the cell's genome, or stable, if it is. Certain viruses also insert their genetic material into the genome.

Organelles

Organelles are parts of the cell that are adapted and/or specialized for carrying out one or more vital functions, analogous to the organs of the human body (such as the heart, lung, and kidney, with each organ performing a different function). Both eukaryotic and prokaryotic cells have organelles, but prokaryotic organelles are generally simpler and are not membrane-bound.

There are several types of organelles in a cell. Some (such as the nucleus and Golgi apparatus) are typically solitary, while others (such as mitochondria, chloroplasts, peroxisomes and lysosomes) can be numerous (hundreds to thousands). The cytosol is the gelatinous fluid that fills the cell and surrounds the organelles.

Eukaryotic

 Cell nucleus: A cell's information center, the cell nucleus is the most conspicuous organelle found in a eukaryotic cell. It houses the cell's chromosomes, and is the place where almost all DNA replication and RNA synthesis (transcription) occur. The nucleus is spherical and separated from the cytoplasm by a double membrane called the nuclear envelope, space between these two membrane is called perinuclear space. The nuclear envelope isolates and protects a cell's DNA from various molecules that could accidentally damage its structure or interfere with its processing. During processing, DNA is transcribed, or copied into a special RNA, called messenger RNA (mRNA). This mRNA is then transported out of the nucleus, where it is translated into a specific protein molecule. The nucleolus is a specialized region within the nucleus where ribosome subunits are assembled. In prokaryotes, DNA processing takes place in the cytoplasm.
 Mitochondria and chloroplasts: generate energy for the cell. Mitochondria are self-replicating double membrane-bound organelles that occur in various numbers, shapes, and sizes in the cytoplasm of all eukaryotic cells. Respiration occurs in the cell mitochondria, which generate the cell's energy by oxidative phosphorylation, using oxygen to release energy stored in cellular nutrients (typically pertaining to glucose) to generate ATP (aerobic respiration). Mitochondria multiply by binary fission, like prokaryotes. Chloroplasts can only be found in plants and algae, and they capture the sun's energy to make carbohydrates through photosynthesis.

 Endoplasmic reticulum: The endoplasmic reticulum (ER) is a transport network for molecules targeted for certain modifications and specific destinations, as compared to molecules that float freely in the cytoplasm. The ER has two forms: the rough ER, which has ribosomes on its surface that secrete proteins into the ER, and the smooth ER, which lacks ribosomes. The smooth ER plays a role in calcium sequestration and release and also helps in synthesis of lipid.
 Golgi apparatus: The primary function of the Golgi apparatus is to process and package the macromolecules such as proteins and lipids that are synthesized by the cell.
 Lysosomes and peroxisomes: Lysosomes contain digestive enzymes (acid hydrolases). They digest excess or worn-out organelles, food particles, and engulfed viruses or bacteria. Peroxisomes have enzymes that rid the cell of toxic peroxides, Lysosomes are optimally active at acidic pH. The cell could not house these destructive enzymes if they were not contained in a membrane-bound system.
 Centrosome: the cytoskeleton organizer: The centrosome produces the microtubules of a cell – a key component of the cytoskeleton. It directs the transport through the ER and the Golgi apparatus. Centrosomes are composed of two centrioles which lie perpendicular to each other in which each has an organization like a cartwheel, which separate during cell division and help in the formation of the mitotic spindle. A single centrosome is present in the animal cells. They are also found in some fungi and algae cells.
 Vacuoles: Vacuoles sequester waste products and in plant cells store water. They are often described as liquid filled spaces and are surrounded by a membrane. Some cells, most notably Amoeba, have contractile vacuoles, which can pump water out of the cell if there is too much water. The vacuoles of plant cells and fungal cells are usually larger than those of animal cells. Vacuoles of plant cells are surrounded by tonoplast which helps in transport of ions and other substances against concentration gradients.

Eukaryotic and prokaryotic
 Ribosomes: The ribosome is a large complex of RNA and protein molecules. They each consist of two subunits, and act as an assembly line where RNA from the nucleus is used to synthesise proteins from amino acids. Ribosomes can be found either floating freely or bound to a membrane (the rough endoplasmatic reticulum in eukaryotes, or the cell membrane in prokaryotes).

 Plastids: Plastid are  membrane-bound organelle generally found in plant cells and euglenoids and contain specific pigments, thus affecting the colour of the plant and organism. And these pigments also helps in food storage and tapping of light energy. There are three types of plastids based upon the specific pigments. Chloroplasts(contains chlorophyll and some carotenoid pigments which helps in the tapping of light energy during photosynthesis), Chromoplasts(contains fat-soluble carotenoid pigments like orange carotene and yellow xanthophylls which helps in synthesis and storage), Leucoplasts(are non-pigmented plastids and helps in storage of nutrients).

Structures outside the cell membrane
Many cells also have structures which exist wholly or partially outside the cell membrane. These structures are notable because they are not protected from the external environment by the semipermeable cell membrane. In order to assemble these structures, their components must be carried across the cell membrane by export processes.

Cell wall

Many types of prokaryotic and eukaryotic cells have a cell wall. The cell wall acts to protect the cell mechanically and chemically from its environment, and is an additional layer of protection to the cell membrane. Different types of cell have cell walls made up of different materials; plant cell walls are primarily made up of cellulose, fungi cell walls are made up of chitin and bacteria cell walls are made up of peptidoglycan.

Prokaryotic

Capsule
A gelatinous capsule is present in some bacteria outside the cell membrane and cell wall. The capsule may be polysaccharide as in pneumococci, meningococci or polypeptide as Bacillus anthracis or hyaluronic acid as in streptococci.
Capsules are not marked by normal staining protocols and can be detected by India ink or methyl blue; which allows for higher contrast between the cells for observation.

Flagella
Flagella are organelles for cellular mobility. The bacterial flagellum stretches from cytoplasm through the cell membrane(s) and extrudes through the cell wall. They are long and thick thread-like appendages, protein in nature. A different type of flagellum is found in archaea and a different type is found in eukaryotes.

Fimbriae
A fimbria (plural fimbriae also known as a pilus, plural pili) is a short, thin, hair-like filament found on the surface of bacteria. Fimbriae are formed of a protein called pilin (antigenic) and are responsible for the attachment of bacteria to specific receptors on human cells (cell adhesion). There are special types of pili involved in bacterial conjugation.

Cellular processes

Replication

Cell division involves a single cell (called a mother cell) dividing into two daughter cells. This leads to growth in multicellular organisms (the growth of tissue) and to procreation (vegetative reproduction) in unicellular organisms. Prokaryotic cells divide by binary fission, while eukaryotic cells usually undergo a process of nuclear division, called mitosis, followed by division of the cell, called cytokinesis. A diploid cell may also undergo meiosis to produce haploid cells, usually four. Haploid cells serve as gametes in multicellular organisms, fusing to form new diploid cells.

DNA replication, or the process of duplicating a cell's genome, always happens when a cell divides through mitosis or binary fission. This occurs during the S phase of the cell cycle.

In meiosis, the DNA is replicated only once, while the cell divides twice. DNA replication only occurs before meiosis I. DNA replication does not occur when the cells divide the second time, in meiosis II. Replication, like all cellular activities, requires specialized proteins for carrying out the job.

DNA repair

In general, cells of all organisms contain enzyme systems that scan their DNA for DNA damage and carry out repair processes when damage is detected. Diverse repair processes have evolved in organisms ranging from bacteria to humans. The widespread prevalence of these repair processes indicates the importance of maintaining cellular DNA in an undamaged state in order to avoid cell death or errors of replication due to damage that could lead to mutation. E. coli bacteria are a well-studied example of a cellular organism with diverse well-defined DNA repair processes. These include: (1) nucleotide excision repair, (2) DNA mismatch repair, (3) non-homologous end joining of double-strand breaks, (4) recombinational repair and (5) light-dependent repair (photoreactivation).

Growth and metabolism

Between successive cell divisions, cells grow through the functioning of cellular metabolism. Cell metabolism is the process by which individual cells process nutrient molecules. Metabolism has two distinct divisions: catabolism, in which the cell breaks down complex molecules to produce energy and reducing power, and anabolism, in which the cell uses energy and reducing power to construct complex molecules and perform other biological functions.
Complex sugars consumed by the organism can be broken down into simpler sugar molecules called monosaccharides such as glucose. Once inside the cell, glucose is broken down to make adenosine triphosphate (ATP), a molecule that possesses readily available energy, through two different pathways.

Protein synthesis

Cells are capable of synthesizing new proteins, which are essential for the modulation and maintenance of cellular activities. This process involves the formation of new protein molecules from amino acid building blocks based on information encoded in DNA/RNA. Protein synthesis generally consists of two major steps: transcription and translation.

Transcription is the process where genetic information in DNA is used to produce a complementary RNA strand. This RNA strand is then processed to give messenger RNA (mRNA), which is free to migrate through the cell. mRNA molecules bind to protein-RNA complexes called ribosomes located in the cytosol, where they are translated into polypeptide sequences. The ribosome mediates the formation of a polypeptide sequence based on the mRNA sequence. The mRNA sequence directly relates to the polypeptide sequence by binding to transfer RNA (tRNA) adapter molecules in binding pockets within the ribosome. The new polypeptide then folds into a functional three-dimensional protein molecule.

Motility

Unicellular organisms can move in order to find food or escape predators. Common mechanisms of motion include flagella and cilia.

In multicellular organisms, cells can move during processes such as wound healing, the immune response and cancer metastasis. For example, in wound healing in animals, white blood cells move to the wound site to kill the microorganisms that cause infection. Cell motility involves many receptors, crosslinking, bundling, binding, adhesion, motor and other proteins. The process is divided into three steps – protrusion of the leading edge of the cell, adhesion of the leading edge and de-adhesion at the cell body and rear, and cytoskeletal contraction to pull the cell forward. Each step is driven by physical forces generated by unique segments of the cytoskeleton.

Navigation, control and communication

In August 2020, scientists described one way cells – in particular cells of a slime mold and mouse pancreatic cancer–derived cells – are able to navigate efficiently through a body and identify the best routes through complex mazes: generating gradients after breaking down diffused chemoattractants which enable them to sense upcoming maze junctions before reaching them, including around corners.

Multicellularity

Cell specialization/differentiation

Multicellular organisms are organisms that consist of more than one cell, in contrast to single-celled organisms.

In complex multicellular organisms, cells specialize into different cell types that are adapted to particular functions. In mammals, major cell types include skin cells, muscle cells, neurons, blood cells, fibroblasts, stem cells, and others. Cell types differ both in appearance and function, yet are genetically identical. Cells are able to be of the same genotype but of different cell type due to the differential expression of the genes they contain.

Most distinct cell types arise from a single totipotent cell, called a zygote, that differentiates into hundreds of different cell types during the course of development. Differentiation of cells is driven by different environmental cues (such as cell–cell interaction) and intrinsic differences (such as those caused by the uneven distribution of molecules during division).

Origin of multicellularity

Multicellularity has evolved independently at least 25 times, including in some prokaryotes, like cyanobacteria, myxobacteria, actinomycetes, Magnetoglobus multicellularis, or Methanosarcina. However, complex multicellular organisms evolved only in six eukaryotic groups: animals, fungi, brown algae, red algae, green algae, and plants. It evolved repeatedly for plants (Chloroplastida), once or twice for animals, once for brown algae, and perhaps several times for fungi, slime molds, and red algae. Multicellularity may have evolved from colonies of interdependent organisms, from cellularization, or from organisms in symbiotic relationships.

The first evidence of multicellularity is from cyanobacteria-like organisms that lived between 3 and 3.5 billion years ago. Other early fossils of multicellular organisms include the contested Grypania spiralis and the fossils of the black shales of the Palaeoproterozoic Francevillian Group Fossil B Formation in Gabon.

The evolution of multicellularity from unicellular ancestors has been replicated in the laboratory, in evolution experiments using predation as the selective pressure.

Origins

The origin of cells has to do with the origin of life, which began the history of life on Earth.

Origin of the first cell

There are several theories about the origin of small molecules that led to life on the early Earth. They may have been carried to Earth on meteorites (see Murchison meteorite), created at deep-sea vents, or synthesized by lightning in a reducing atmosphere (see Miller–Urey experiment). There is little experimental data defining what the first self-replicating forms were. RNA is thought to be the earliest self-replicating molecule, as it is capable of both storing genetic information and catalyzing chemical reactions (see RNA world hypothesis), but some other entity with the potential to self-replicate could have preceded RNA, such as clay or peptide nucleic acid.

Cells emerged at least 3.5 billion years ago. The current belief is that these cells were heterotrophs. The early cell membranes were probably more simple and permeable than modern ones, with only a single fatty acid chain per lipid. Lipids are known to spontaneously form bilayered vesicles in water, and could have preceded RNA, but the first cell membranes could also have been produced by catalytic RNA, or even have required structural proteins before they could form.

Origin of eukaryotic cells

The eukaryotic cell seems to have evolved from a symbiotic community of prokaryotic cells. DNA-bearing organelles like the mitochondria and the chloroplasts are descended from ancient symbiotic oxygen-breathing Alphaproteobacteria and "Cyanobacteria", respectively, which were endosymbiosed by an ancestral archaean prokaryote.

There is still considerable debate about whether organelles like the hydrogenosome predated the origin of mitochondria, or vice versa: see the hydrogen hypothesis for the origin of eukaryotic cells.

History of research

 1632–1723: Antonie van Leeuwenhoek taught himself to make lenses, constructed basic optical microscopes and drew protozoa, such as Vorticella from rain water, and bacteria from his own mouth.
 1665: Robert Hooke discovered cells in cork, then in living plant tissue using an early compound microscope. He coined the term cell (from Latin cellula, meaning "small room") in his book Micrographia (1665).
 1839: Theodor Schwann and Matthias Jakob Schleiden elucidated the principle that plants and animals are made of cells, concluding that cells are a common unit of structure and development, and thus founding the cell theory.
 1855: Rudolf Virchow stated that new cells come from pre-existing cells by cell division (omnis cellula ex cellula).
 1859: The belief that life forms can occur spontaneously (generatio spontanea) was contradicted by Louis Pasteur (1822–1895) (although Francesco Redi had performed an experiment in 1668 that suggested the same conclusion).
 1931: Ernst Ruska built the first transmission electron microscope (TEM) at the University of Berlin. By 1935, he had built an EM with twice the resolution of a light microscope, revealing previously unresolvable organelles.
 1953: Based on Rosalind Franklin's work, Watson and Crick made their first announcement on the double helix structure of DNA.
 1981: Lynn Margulis published Symbiosis in Cell Evolution detailing the endosymbiotic theory.

See also 

 Cell cortex
 Cell culture
 Cellular model
 Cytorrhysis
 Cytoneme
 Cytotoxicity
 Human cell
 Lipid raft
 List of distinct cell types in the adult human body
 Outline of cell biology
 Parakaryon myojinensis
 Plasmolysis
 Syncytium
 Tunneling nanotube
 Vault (organelle)

References

Further reading 

 
 ; The fourth edition is freely available  from National Center for Biotechnology Information Bookshelf.

External links 

 MBInfo – Descriptions on Cellular Functions and Processes
 Inside the Cell  – a science education booklet by National Institutes of Health, in PDF and ePub.
 Cell Biology in "The Biology Project" of University of Arizona.
 Centre of the Cell online
 The Image & Video Library of The American Society for Cell Biology , a collection of peer-reviewed still images, video clips and digital books that illustrate the structure, function and biology of the cell.
 WormWeb.org: Interactive Visualization of the C. elegans Cell lineage – Visualize the entire cell lineage tree of the nematode C. elegans

 
 
1665 in science